Trinity Catholic High School is an 11–18 mixed, Roman Catholic, voluntary aided school and sixth form in Woodford Green, Greater London, England. It was established in 1976 following the amalgamation of Holy Family Convent School (now Upper Site) and St Paul's Catholic Secondary School (now Lower Site). It is part of the Roman Catholic Diocese of Brentwood.

History

The Duchess and her legacy: 1878 – 1944

In the Franciscan Annals of March 1878, a member of the Third Order of St. Francis wrote,

"There is a large district fringing the Loughton and Ongar branch of the Great Eastern Railway stretching from Stratford to Ongar, embracing the parishes of Woodford, Woodford Bridge, Chingford, Loughton, Chigwell, Chigwell Row, Epping and adjacent places without a church (St. George’s Walthamstow is the nearest, except St. Helen’s Ongar at the extreme end) at which the faithful can assist at the holy sacrifice. A Brother of the Third Order of St. Francis, anxious for the salvation of so many thousands of souls residing in this large district and therefore removed from the life-giving influence of our holy religion, asks his brethren and sisters of the Third Order to unite with him in  a daily visit to the Blessed Sacrament and to offer in connection with this visit, a Pater, Ave, Gloria, that Almighty God will be pleased to establish a mission."

This anonymous quotation is often seen as the first inspiration for the founding of the friary church of St. Thomas of Canterbury and its adjoining schools at Woodford in the county of Essex. These standard accounts go on to explain how, some 15 years later, Cardinal Vaughan, Archbishop of Westminster, was taking a rest at Ascot in the home of Lady Henrietta Pelham-Clinton, Dowager Duchess of Newcastle. During this visit the Cardinal happened to lament the fact that there was no Catholic church or school between St. George's Walthamstow and St. Helen's Ongar. He went on to express a wish to establish a Catholic community in the Epping Forest area, the Duchess immediately offered her financial help. Accordingly, in 1894-1895 matters moved swiftly apace to remedy the situation with the building of the present Friary church.  A foundation stone was laid on 18 May 1895 and, within a year, the new church was consecrated on 7 July 1896.

Cardinal Herbert Vaughan (1832-1903)  was one of the great architects of Catholic Expansion in London and the South-East, he founded seminaries, churches and especially schools. The Cardinal did much to secure the Education Act of 1902 which obtained State Aid for Catholic Education. He also saw the need for the Church to establish itself in the growing suburbs around London. Both he and the Duchess of Newcastle believed Woodford was a potential area for such Catholic expansion.

Henrietta was born in 1843 at Deepdene, a beautiful estate at Boxhill in Surrey, the only and beloved daughter of the merchant Henry Thomas Hope whose family once owned the famous diamond called after their name. In 1861, at the age of 18, Henrietta married Lord Lincoln, later 5th Duke of Newcastle by whom she had two sons and three daughters.  In 1879, the Duke died and, in the same year, Henrietta, who had always been identified with the most advanced section of Anglicanism, was received into the Catholic Church.

In 1880, Henrietta remarried Thomas Theobald Herbert (obit 1892): Henrietta became a leading Catholic figure in London and was a firm friend of Carinal Herbert Vaughan. On his transfer to Westminster in 1892. Vaughan encouraged Henrietta's growing absorption with the poor in London's East End. She left her mansion in Hill Street, Berkeley Square and moved to a house she named St. Anthony's in Great Prescott Street by Tower Hill. (1893). Henrietta, who had often been associated with many Catholic charities, deeply admired the Sisters of the Holy Family of Bordeaux who worked amongst poor Catholic girls and young women in the East End of London. They formed an association to keep them off the streets and train them in cooking, needlework and other domestic skills.

Henrietta used her own house and another in Great Prescott Street to become actively involved in this work.  She was joined by two other ladies and they took the name of the Ladies of Charity of St, Vincent de Paul. High society in London regarded Henrietta as rather eccentric and when Lady Paget asked her "Were it not better to help those who tried to help themselves?"  Henrietta replied that she loved the worst cases and Lady Paget's advice would not provide her with sufficient excitement.

Indeed, Henrietta had a shrewd brain and, contrary to the description of her in "Pall Mall" magazine, as being "completely given up to good works in the East End," her obituary in the "Woodford Times," 9 March 1915, described her as follows: "She had a very artistic nature and a keen perception of all things beautiful and was an enthusiastic musician. She was practical and business-like, seeing that organisations under her superintendence were working decently and in order. She was greatly loved by all who knew her well."  Henrietta had spent a great deal of time in France where she had witnessed the Church's battle to defend its schools against the 4th Republic.  She was also influenced by the growing clamour of English Nonconformists to control their own schools and Cardinal Vaughan's ardent belief that the Catholic Church in England not be limited to social work in the slums. Henrietta was equally determined to establish communities which would provide for all aspects of the growing Catholic population. Consequently, there can be no doubt about the Evangelical missionary nature of the new Friary and Parish church in Woodford. The building of St. Thomas of Canterbury, the foundation of the ‘Iron School,’ the purchase of property in Mornington Road for a convent school run by the Sisters of the Holy Family of Bordeaux are clear expressions both of Cardinal Vaughan and the Duchess of Newcastle's vision.

The Duchess steadfastly continued her work but, on 8 May 1913, she died of a stroke, her requiem took place in the church she loved (there had been a private entrance from the church to the Duchess’ apartments, probably where the repository now stands) and she was buried at St. Patrick's cemetery, Leytonstone.  The Franciscans of the Woodford community, however, kept insisting that St. Thomas of Canterbury Church would be a more suitable resting place for the Dowager Duchess. Henrietta's son agreed, her remains were exhumed on 2 July 1913, transferred to Woodford and, after a requiem Mass, re-interred in the floor of the chapel of St. Francis to the right of the present high altar. A simple memorial tablet marks her resting place.

The founding of Trinity: 1944 – 1981 

One of the greatest successes of the parish, which fitted closely into the ideals of the founding Dowager Duchess, was the expansion of Catholic education in the Woodford area.  Butler's Education Act of 1944 completely reorganised state education and soon made its impact felt on St. Anthony's School. From its formation until 1946, St. Anthony's had been an all age elementary school but, from September of that year, all senior children of both sexes who had not qualified by means of examination at age 11 for admission to selective schools, were automatically transferred to St. George's Secondary School at Walthamstow. The effect on Catholic education in the area was parlous and led, in 1950, to the formation of one of the most powerful pressure groups ever instituted in the parish, the C.P.E.A., the Catholic Parents and Electors Association. They immediately adopted a high profile, not only on general educational issues, but in an attempt to rationalise and develop Catholic education in the area. The C.P.E.A. received tremendous help from the Franciscan community: extra land was given by the Fathers to St. Anthony's School for its enlargement and, in September 1958, the friars considered the selling of the Montclair site for the new secondary modern school of St. Paul's. In 1962 Monclair was eventually sold and, in September 1964, the new secondary modern school opened its doors. The C.P.E.A. were also instrumental in the development of the convent school in Mornington Road. In 1945 this had been placed on the list of schools recognised by the Ministry of Education and became known as St. Mary's Grammar School. Due to the efforts of the C.P.E.A., the new Grammar School obtained aided status. The need, however, to establish a long-term solution to Catholic education 11 – 18 continued and reached its climax in September 1976 when St. Mary's Grammar School (Mornington Road) and St. Paul's Secondary Modern School (Sydney Road) were merged into the new Comprehensive Trinity Catholic High School. The Franciscan and Parish community was generous in their support of the C.P.E.A. and the Diocese of Brentwood, not only in a pecuniary fashion, but being involved on the Governing Boards and in the busy pastoral work of these merging schools.

1976 saw Prime Minister James Callaghan's initiative implemented, the creation of comprehensive schools on a national level. The amalgamation of St. Paul's and St. Mary's Grammar schools were part of this. Sister Mary-Joachim eventually retired as Headteacher of St. Mary's Grammar School and Mr Joseph Green became overall Head of both sites, now reconstituted as Trinity Catholic High School. In 1981, Mr Joseph Green retired after long years of faithful service and Dr P.C. Doherty OBE was appointed as his successor with Michael Wilshaw as his First Deputy (Sir Michael Wilshaw later became Her Majesty's Chief Inspector of Schools, after his outstanding service both at Trinity and St. Bonaventure's Newham).

The development of Trinity: 1981 – present

By 1981, the Governors were fully aware of the challenges facing them and they responded accordingly. One major problem was the school was a split site and the buildings on both sites left a great deal to be desired. St. Paul's was simply a secondary modern collection of buildings with flat roofs and a range of general classrooms. The Upper Site consisted of at least 10 mobiles, an antiquated dining hall and two science blocks. The Upper Site, however, was blessed with Trinity House, a very sturdy, well-built edifice with a purpose-built gymnasium as an annexe. The Governors achievement over the next few years was truly outstanding. On the Upper Site they managed to settle a dispute with the order which still owned part of the land. The Governors were now able to develop the entire site with the tremendous support of the local authority, in particular Mr Keith Ratcliffe, (Director of Education) and two of his principal officers, Mr Don Capper and Mr Peter Randall. Of course, the Governors were well supported by the Diocese of Brentwood, in particular Mr David Squires. Once the Governors had settled the land question, they were able to remove all of the mobiles and replace them with elegant, purpose-built classrooms creating a quad-like atmosphere with Ratcliffe Hall, Carla House, Rackham House (named after the principle architect, Mr David Rackham), Grainger House, Pelham House and Monteluce House.

All these new centres of learning covered a wide spectrum of the curriculum, be it the Sciences, Technology, Mathematics and Business Studies. The two former classroom blocks were re-cladded and named Vincent and Becket House respectively. The latest addition to the development on the Upper Site has been the construction of St. Joseph's House which provides a Sixth Form common room, offices and relaxation areas. The Governors were desirous of ensuring that the grounds of the Upper Site were also refurbished taking a particular interest in the layout of new garden plots, pathways, play areas and entrances. Flowerbeds are carefully nourished whilst the Catholic nature of the school is immediately apparent to any visitor with judiciously placed statues of the Virgin Mary, St. Joseph and St. Anthony of Padua.  Of course, these latter years has seen the implementation of new fencing, proper gating and a comprehensive security system. Trinity House also has been developed with the creation of a new library, drama suites, media suite and reception areas as well as the construction and development of a consecrated chapel (The Chapel of the Holy Spirit) on the second floor of Trinity House.  New offices were created and the Henrietta Suite was built and developed as the school's IT centre.  Naturally, maintenance and changes of facilities such as toilets, bathrooms etc., have taken place.

On the Lower Site, developments have taken place where possible. There have been internal changes such as the creation of new offices, the implementation of a security system and the setting up of a consecrated chapel (The Chapel of the Divine Child).  The Governors were also able to maintain and monitor the erection of new buildings such as Arcella House (Science), the Padua Centre (Biology Lab) and St. Paul's (Modern Languages). A new roof was replaced on the gym to eradicate the problem of leaks. Toilets and changing rooms have been refurbished, the outside of the building re-cladded and windows replaced.

One of the great achievements of the Governing Board was that Trinity did not have any playing fields but due to the good offices of the local authority and sterling work by Senior Managers, Trinity managed to gain a long-term lease on Whitbreads playing field with its spacious grounds and well maintained changing rooms.  The physical development of Trinity has also been matched by a growth in the spiritual and academic life of the school. Each site has a consecrated chapel and Mass and/or Service of the Word is regularly celebrated. Indeed, the chapels are the epicentre of the rich, religious, liturgical life of our school. On the academic pastoral side, Trinity has continued to strive for excellence, this has been acknowledged by Ofsted who describe the school as "Outstanding" in all five of its formal inspections. The Governors and school community are very proud of this but, at the same time, bearing in mind our motto "In Christ we shall Flourish" we continue to strive to the vision we follow on behalf of the children we serve.

In May 1999, the Department for Education and Employment (DFEE) nominated it as a "Beacon School" to show good practice both locally and nationally.

Notable alumni 
 James Argent, television personality
 Nicholas Browne, cricketer
 Catherine Dalton, cricketer
 Meryl Fernandes, actress
 Matt Harrold, footballer
 Andrew Joslin, cricketer
 Oscar Kelly, para-triathlete
 Daniel Lawrence, cricketer
 Louise Lombard, actress
 Gary Lucy, actor
 Christine Ohuruogu, athlete
 Kele Okereke, musician
 Tamzin Outhwaite, actress
 Darel Russell, footballer
 Peta Todd, glamour model
 Miranda Brawn, lawyer and philanthropist 
 Conor Coventry, footballer
 Matt Ward, record producer and songwriter

Notable staff 
 Paul C. Doherty, current headmaster
 Michael Wilshaw, former deputy head

References

External links 
 

Secondary schools in the London Borough of Redbridge
Catholic secondary schools in the Diocese of Brentwood
Voluntary aided schools in London
Educational institutions established in 1976
1976 establishments in England